Southwest University of Political Science and Law (SWUPL) is a national public university located in Chongqing, China.

It was founded in 1953 with the original name Southwest College of Political Science and Law. It was one of the first faculties of political science and law established after the People's Republic of China was established.  Its law school ranks third among all the law schools in China. Notable alumni include Liang Huixing, Liang Zhiping, He Weifang, Xu Zhangrun and Zhang Xinbao.

Zhou Qiang, a grade 1978 alumnus from the Law Department of SWUPL, was elected president and chief justice of the Supreme People's Court of China at the fifth plenary meeting of the first session of the 12th National People's Congress (NPC) in Beijing on March 15, 2013.

History
As one of the oldest political science and law universities in China, Southwest University of Political Science and Law (SWUPL) developed from the Department of Political Science and Law at Southwest University of People’s Revolution which was founded in 1950, with Marshal Liu Bocheng as the university president.

In 1953, SWUPL was officially established through merging the Political Science and Law departments of Chongqing University and Sichuan University, the Law departments of Chongqing Finance and Economy College, and of Guizhou University and Yunnan University.

In 1978, the university was accredited as a key university by the State Council. In 2000, the administration of the university was transferred from the Ministry of Justice to the Chongqing municipality, thus creating a system of co-administration between the central and local government.

In 2003, it was approved as one of the first universities to grant doctoral degree of first-level legal discipline. In 2004, it established one post-doctorate mobile station of Law. In 2007, SWUPL was awarded as “excellent undergraduate education” by Ministry of Education.

In 2008, SWUPL became the key university co-administrated by Ministry of Education and Chongqing Municipality.

SWUPL became the first University in Chongqing co-administered by the Ministry and Municipality. On October 24, 2012.

The university has three campuses, the main in Yubei, the other two in Shapingba and Baoshenghu, covering a total area of 3136.17 mu. There are 14 schools, including School of Civil and Commercial law, School of Economic Law, Law School, School of Administrative Law, School of International Law, School of Criminal investigation, School of Marxism, School of Juris Master, School of Management, School of Politics and Public Administration, School of Journalism and Communication, School of Foreign Languages, School of Applied Law, and School of Economics.

It offers 20 bachelor’s programs, 37 master’s programs of sub-disciplines, 4 professional master’s programs and 10 doctoral programs of sub-discipline, and 2 national key disciplines.  The university has postdoctoral center for legal research and 6 provincial key bases for humanity and social science research.  It has 1421 faculty and staff members, among which 1157 are full-time. It has 5159 postgraduates and 18591 undergraduates.  The university’s library has over 4,200,000 books.

SWUPL has international exchange programs with over 60 universities from the US, United Kingdom, France, Germany, Japan, Thailand, and South Korea. In 2014, SWUPL and Coventry University established China's only undergraduate Sino-UK English Law programme. SWUPL and University of Montana have also jointly established the first Confucius Institute in Northwest of US.  In 2011, SWUPL and the United Nations Institute for Training and Research (UNITAR) signed a cooperation agreement on the International Training Centre for local Authorities Project. The project, with a total of US$100 million investment, will build training center in SWUPL and make full use of the training resources of the United Nations.

63 years since the foundation of the university, SWUPL has developed a multi-level and multi-type higher education for undergraduates, postgraduates, doctoral candidates, and international students, and has educated more than 200,000 high ranking specialized personnel.  It is the university that provided the most law personnel for the country.  A large number of alumni have become leading figures in law and other professions.
.

Location
The University consist of Shapingba and Yubei Campuses in Chongqing municipality.

See also
List of universities and colleges in Chongqing
List of universities in China

References

External links
 Official Website of SWUPL 
 http://www.swupl.edu.cn/ 

 
Universities and colleges in Chongqing
Law schools in China
Educational institutions established in 1953
1953 establishments in China
Political science in China
Political science education